Laura Moriarty (born April 8, 1952) is an American poet and novelist.

Life and work
Moriarty was born in St. Paul, Minnesota, grew up on Cape Cod in Massachusetts and has lived in Northern California since 1966. She attended Sacramento State University and the University of California at Berkeley in the 1970s. She was married to the poet Jerry Estrin until his death in 1993, and is currently married to the poet/librarian Nick Robinson.

Moriarty was the Archives Director for the Poetry Center and American Poetry Archives at San Francisco State University from 1986-1997. She received a Poetry Center Book Award in 1984 for Persia. She has also been awarded a Gerbode Foundation grant, a residency at the Foundation Royaumont in France, a New Langton Arts Award in Literature and a grant from the Fund for Poetry. Moriarty has taught at Mills College, and Naropa University, among other places, and served as deputy director of Small Press Distribution in Berkeley, California, until her retirement.

References

List of publications 
Two Cross Seizings. Sombre Reptiles, 1980.
Persia. Chance Additions, 1983.
Duse. Coincidence Press, 1987. (reprint: Paradigm Press, 2000)
like roads. Kelsey St. Press, 1990. 
Rondeaux. Roof Books, 1990.
L'archiviste. Zasterle Press, 1991.
Symmetry. Avec Books, 1996.
Spicer's City. Poetry New York, 1998.
The Case. O Books, 1998.
Cunning, a short novel. Spuyten Duyvil, 1999.
Nude Memoir. Krupskaya, 2000.
Self-Destruction. Post-Apollo Press, 2004.
Ultravioleta, a novel. Atelos, 2006.
A Semblance: Selected and New Poems, 1975 - 2007. Omnidawn Publishing, 2007.
An Air Force. Hooke Press, 2007.
 A Tonalist. Nightboat, 2010.

External links 
Laura Moriarty's A Tonalist Notes: Poetics Politics Prosody Poetry
Bio of Laura Moriarty at the Electronic Poetry Center, SUNY Buffalo
Laura Moriarty at Rain Taxi Book Festival
Publisher page for Laura Moriarty's A Semblance
Review of Laura Moriarty's An Air Force and A Semblance at Ron Silliman's Blog
Review of Laura Moriarty's A Semblance at Publishers Weekly
Review of Laura Moriarty's novel Ultravioleta at Publishers Weekly
Laura Moriarty: Video and Links At the Omnidawn Publisher's Blog
A Tonalist Thinking essay
(Dis)solution a poem from A Tonalist
 Moriarty's reviews of Kutik's Ode (translated by Kit Robinson)

1952 births
Living people
20th-century American novelists
21st-century American novelists
American women novelists
Writers from Saint Paul, Minnesota
California State University, Sacramento alumni
University of California, Berkeley alumni
Mills College faculty
Naropa University faculty
American women poets
20th-century American women writers
21st-century American women writers
20th-century American poets
21st-century American poets
Novelists from Minnesota
Novelists from Colorado
American women academics